Timochares trifasciata, the many-banded skipper, is a butterfly in the family Hesperiidae. It is found from eastern and western Mexico to southern Brazil, Paraguay and Argentina.

Subspecies
Timochares trifasciata trifasciata (Mexico to Paraguay and Brazil)
Timochares trifasciata sanda Evans, 1953 (Argentina)

References

Butterflies described in 1868
Erynnini
Butterflies of North America
Hesperiidae of South America
Taxa named by William Chapman Hewitson